Beki River (also known as the Kurissu River in Bhutan) is one of the right bank tributaries of the mighty Brahmaputra River, which flows down from the Bhutan region but a large portion flows in Indian state Assam. It touches flows from Bhutan touching Mathanguri, Naranguri, Khusrabari, Valaguri, Mainamata, Udalguri, Barpeta Road, Nichukha, Sorbhog, Kalgachia, Balaipathar, Kharballi, Bardanga, Kamarpara, Srirampur, Daoukmari, Jania, Chanpur, Rubi,Sawpur, Gobindapur, Moinbari and Balikuri. There are views of the river and its surroundings from the bridges situated on NH no- 31.

Etymology
Beki is Boro origin. Bengkhi() means feminine form of Bent.

Origin 
Beki River, also known as Kurissu River in Bhutan, lies between 26° 20' 00" N; 90° 56' 00" E which comes from Himalayan glacier. Bhutan has several major river systems flowing swiftly out of the Himalayas that are fed by glaciers in northern Bhutan. They flow south and join the Brahmaputra River basin in India. The Brahmaputra flows into Bangladesh and drains into the Bay of Bengal.

Soil erosion 

The soil erosion of Beki river has become a major problem of flowing two districts Barpeta and Baksa of Assam.

References 

Rivers of Assam
Rivers of Bhutan
Sacred rivers
Tributaries of the Brahmaputra River
Rivers of India